Sofia Tanghetti (born 3 May 1999) is an Italian rower.

She won a silver medal in the Lightweight Women's Pair category at the 2019 World Rowing Championships.

References

External links

1999 births
Living people
Italian female rowers
World Rowing Championships medalists for Italy